The Bocas del Dragón (Dragon's Mouths) is the name of the series of straits separating the Gulf of Paria from the Caribbean Sea.  There are four Bocas, from west to east:
 The Boca Grande or Grand Boca separates Chacachacare from the Paria Peninsula and Patos Island of Venezuela.  The international border between Trinidad and Tobago and Venezuela runs through this strait.
 The Boca de Navios or Third Boca which separates Chacachacare from Huevos.
 The Boca de Huevos or Second Boca which separates Huevos from Monos.
 The Boca de Monos or First Boca which separates Monos from the Chaguaramas Peninsula of Trinidad.

The passage was named by Christopher Columbus on his third voyage.

References

Gulf of Paria
Bodies of water of Trinidad and Tobago
International straits
Trinidad and Tobago–Venezuela border
Straits of the Caribbean
Straits of Venezuela